The Karmøy Tunnel was the longest subsea road tunnel in Norway until the opening of Ryfast in 2019, and is located in the municipalities of Karmøy and Tysvær in Rogaland county. The town of Kopervik lies just south of the western end of the tunnel. 

The tunnel is a major part of the T-Link project, which is a toll road project that was opened in September 2013.  At Fosen, the Karmøy Tunnel has an underground roundabout which connects it to another (much shorter) tunnel which heads north to a highway that leads to the town of Haugesund.  The Karmøy Tunnel goes under the Karmsundet strait and the Førresfjorden. The tunnel also goes under the northern edge of the Norsk Hydro facility in Karmøy.

References

Subsea tunnels in Norway
Road tunnels in Rogaland
Karmøy
Tysvær